John Fashanu (born 18 September 1962) is an English television presenter and former professional footballer. 

In his former career, he was a centre-forward from 1978 until 1995, most notably in an eight-year spell at Wimbledon in which he won the FA Cup in 1988 and scored over 100 goals in all competitions. He was also capped twice at senior level by England. Over his entire playing career, he also played for Norwich City, Miramar Rangers, Lincoln City, Crystal Palace, Millwall and Aston Villa. He scored 134 league goals in a career lasting 17 years.

Following his football career, he went on to co-host British television show Gladiators in the 1990s, and between 2003 and 2004 he managed his own Sunday league football side Fash FC on Bravo.

Early life
Fashanu was born in Kensington, London, the son of Pearl Gopal, a nurse from British Guiana and Patrick Fashanu, a Nigerian barrister living in the UK. When his parents split up he was sent, together with his older brother Justin, to a Barnardo's care home. When he was five, he and his brother were fostered by Alf and Betty Jackson and were subsequently brought up in Shropham near Attleborough, Norfolk.

Football career

Early career
Fashanu's footballing career began at Norwich City in 1979, and he turned professional two years later – just as his brother Justin was transferred to Nottingham Forest from the relegated Carrow Road club.

Norwich were promoted straight back to the First Division in 1981–82, but Fashanu managed just five league appearances and scored once. He managed two appearances in the 1982–83 First Division campaign – which would be his last for the club. He was never a regular player at Carrow Road.

He had a brief loan spell with Crystal Palace from Norwich. He also played in the English off-season in New Zealand with Miramar Rangers, and made an appearance in the final of the local equivalent of the FA Cup, the Chatham Cup (he remains the only player to have played in the final of both the English and New Zealand major cup competitions).

Having failed to win a regular place in Norwich’s first team, he joined Lincoln City on a free transfer on 23 September 1983, when they were in the Third Division. He scored seven goals from 26 league games that season, and managed four from 10 league games the following campaign before his £55,000 transfer to Third Division promotion challengers Millwall on 30 November 1984. In his first season at The Den Fashanu scored four goals in 25 games helping the Lions reach the FA Cup quarter-finals (where they lost at Luton Town in a game marred by fans who invaded the pitch) and secure promotion to the Second Division. He managed eight goals from 25 games in 1985–86, before leaving to join Wimbledon towards the end of the Second Division season.

Wimbledon
Fashanu made a £125,000 move to Second Division promotion contenders Wimbledon in March 1986, when they were pushing for a third promotion in four seasons as they looked to complete a rapid rise from the Fourth Division to the First. At the time, he was the club's record signing.

Fashanu's four goals from the remaining nine league games helped Wimbledon seal the final promotion place and they were a First Division side a mere nine years after being elected to the Football League - and also became only the second club in Football League history to be promoted three divisions in four seasons.

Fashanu and his colleagues settled well into the First Division, surprising all the observers by finishing sixth in the league (briefly topping the table in early September) and finishing above traditional big clubs including Nottingham Forest and Manchester United. Fashanu was Wimbledon's top scorer with 11 league goals, and would be a regular goalscorer in the top flight for the Dons for a further seven seasons.

In 1988, Fashanu helped Wimbledon win the FA Cup, beating Liverpool in a final that was billed as a "rags versus riches" affair, although the two clubs were separated by just six places in the First Division - as Liverpool had been the dominant side in English football for some 15 years whereas Wimbledon had played just two seasons in the First Division and only 11 as a Football League club. He performed well in the league again, scoring 14 goals.

He also scored Wimbledon's goal as Liverpool defeated them 2–1 in that year's Charity Shield. Fashanu claimed two England caps – against Chile and Scotland in a friendly tournament in May 1989, but did not score.

During his time at Wimbledon, Fashanu scored 126 goals. His best season was 1990–91, when he was the First Division's second highest scorer with 20 goals as his side finished seventh.

He received criticism during the 1993–94 season when a clash with Gary Mabbutt, then Spurs captain, in an aerial challenge left the Spurs defender with a broken skull and eye socket. Fashanu had already established a reputation by that point of being a very aggressive and physical striker, and this was seen as another example of that behaviour. At that time synonymous with Wimbledon's "Crazy Gang" which had built up a reputation for this style of play, also exhibited by the likes of Vinnie Jones and Dennis Wise.

Aston Villa
On 4 August 1994, just before the start of the 1994–95 season, Fashanu was sold to Aston Villa for £1.35million. However, injury restricted him to just 13 games and 3 goals for a Villa side who narrowly avoided relegation that season. He managed a goal on his Villa debut when they drew 2–2 at Everton on the opening day of the Premier League season, his other two goals coming in successive games against Queens Park Rangers and then Nottingham Forest in January.

Fashanu's last game was on 4 February 1995 away at Manchester United in a Premiership game that they lost 1–0. In a tackle with Ryan Giggs he snapped his knee ligaments and was stretchered off. After the end of the season, Fashanu retired as a result of this injury.

In 1995, he hit the front pages as well as the back when The Sun published allegations of match fixing against Fashanu, fellow Wimbledon player Hans Segers and Liverpool goalkeeper Bruce Grobbelaar. All three players were eventually cleared of the allegations in a subsequent court case in August 1997.

International career
Fashanu represented England at full International level gaining two caps – against Chile and Scotland in the 1989 Rous Cup, due to his good form at club level for his then club Wimbledon. He was also eligible to play for Nigeria and since retiring he has expressed regret in not being able to do so.

Post-football career 
Following retirement from the game through injury, Fashanu became a television presenter. He presented the UK edition of Gladiators alongside Ulrika Jonsson in the 1990s. In 2003, he came second in the second series of I'm a Celebrity... Get Me out of Here!. Later that year he presented Fash's Football Challenge, a reality television show that followed Fashanu managing an amateur football team. Also in 2003, he fronted a six-part series for ITV1 based on the American format Man vs. Beast, however following protests from animal rights groups, the series was never broadcast. He also released a video "Focus on Fitness with Fash". He is now host of Deal or No Deal Nigeria, airing on M-Net Africa.

Since retirement Fashanu has also maintained his sporting connections, becoming involved with the Nigeria Football Association, and as chairman of Welsh football team Barry Town for one year, vacating this post in 2003.

In 2000, he also compiled, all with an investigator, a report on corruption in Nigeria in the 1980s and 1990s that came to be known as the Fashanu Report. In 2003, he became the manager of his own Sunday league football team Fash FC as part of a television reality show.

In September 2005 Wimbledon Old Players' Association was launched. John is involved in the Wimbledon Old Players' Association, an organisation set up by the Wimbledon Independent Supporters Association. He said: "It's going to be great to be back as part of the Wimbledon family. As an ex-Wimbledon player, I know all about the heroics of the likes of Roy Law and Dickie Guy in the old days, as well as what the new boys have been doing at AFC Wimbledon".

In 2007, The Times named him 22nd out of the 50 worst footballers to have played in the Premier League.

In August 2009, Fashanu, who in 2000 accused Bob Minton and Ibrahim Babangida of stealing money from Nigeria, apologised saying "I can say it again and again, that there was nothing like debt buy-back or any billions stacked away in any account anywhere." Minton said that Fashanu was given false information by the Church of Scientology to attack him. 

In January 2023, Fashanu was a contestant on the fifteenth series of Dancing on Ice. He was paired with Alexandra Schauman and was first to be eliminated.

Personal life
Fashanu, who was the younger brother of Justin Fashanu, disowned his brother after the latter came out as gay, telling The Voice that Justin was "an outcast". After Justin took his own life in 1998, Fashanu expressed remorse for abandoning his brother. However, in an interview with TalkSPORT in 2012, John Fashanu claimed his brother was not gay and was merely an attention seeker.

Fashanu has two sons, Amir and Akio, and two daughters, Alana and Amal.

Fashanu has been married three times, according to a documentary on football culture made by his daughter Amal. He met his first wife, a Spaniard, when they were both 18. That marriage broke up when Amal was two years old.

Fashanu holds a black belt in Karate.

In pop culture
 Australian band Magic Lunchbox recorded a song about John Fashanu entitled "Fashanu" on their 2005 album Spastique.
 He appeared on Channel 4's Come Dine with Me for a football special shortly prior to the 2010 FIFA World Cup.
 The satirical current affairs programme The Day Today featured a trailer for a fictional show titled "John Fashanu". The trailer consisted of various clips of Fashanu accompanied by sinister music and a voice-over (Chris Morris) saying the words "John Fashanu" five times. This was followed by presenter Chris Morris pronouncing the name incorrectly.
 Fashanu was voted twice to be part in the BBC's satirical "England's Worst ever football team" TV movie, the first time in 2010 and the second time in 2014.

Honours
Wimbledon
 FA Cup: 1987–88

References

Notes
The IMDb page for the TV show Football Challenge on their website, this is incorrect and the show was actually called Fash FC.

External links

Career information at ex-canaries.co.uk
The Observer, 3 August 2003, Fashanu myth

1962 births
Living people
Aston Villa F.C. players
Black British sportsmen
Black British television personalities
Crystal Palace F.C. players
English footballers
England international footballers
English people of Guyanese descent
English people of Nigerian descent
English people of Yoruba descent
English television presenters
Yoruba sportspeople
Lincoln City F.C. players
Millwall F.C. players
Norwich City F.C. players
Footballers from Kensington
Premier League players
Wimbledon F.C. players
Association football controversies
Miramar Rangers AFC players
People from Attleborough
Association football forwards
English male karateka
I'm a Celebrity...Get Me Out of Here! (British TV series) participants
FA Cup Final players
Gladiators (1992 British TV series)
Sportspeople involved in betting scandals